Acanthurus fowleri is a tropical fish which is found in coral reefs in the Philippines, Indonesia, Papua New Guinea, Solomon Islands, and Australia. It is also commonly known as the Fowler's surgeonfish or the horse-shoe surgeonfish.

References

Acanthuridae
Acanthurus
Fish of Thailand
Fish described in 1851